Mattituck-Cutchogue Union Free School District is a public school district located on the North Fork of Long Island, in Suffolk County, New York, United States.  It primarily serves the western part of the Town of Southold, as well as a small portion of the Town of Riverhead, and includes the census-designated places of Mattituck, Cutchogue and Laurel, New Suffolk and portions of Jamesport and Peconic.  To the east, the district is bordered by the Southold Union Free School District; and on the west, the Riverhead Central School District.

The total enrollment for the 2007-2008 school year was 1,614 students.

The superintendent is Anne H. Smith Ed. D.

Schools 

Mattituck-Cutchogue Jr/Sr High School (often referred to as Mattituck High School) caters to students in 7th grade-12th grade. It also operates an email service for these students.  The high school building was originally built in 1934.

Officials include

Superintendent- Anne Smith
Principal- Shawn Petretti
Assistant Principal- David Smith
Jr. High Dean- Pat Arslanian
High school Dean- Frank Massa

Cutchogue East Elementary School caters to students in grades from kindergarten to 6th grade. They have a strict policy on kindness and grade students with a 1-4 grading system. Through the years this has been considered a very good school.

Officials include
Principal-Amy Brennan
Vice principal- Kristina Moon

History 

The school district was formed in the early 1970s when the Cutchogue and Mattituck school districts combined.  After a vote in 1997, the 100-student Laurel school district was added.

In recent years, one of the major problems in this district has been the budget.  It passed in 2007, but was turned down in 2005, leading to austerity. From there an organization was created, The Mattituck Cutchogue Fund For Students. I

In 2015, the Mattituck High School Varsity Baseball Team won the New York State Class B title, the first state championship in the program's 95-year history.

In 2018 student, Brad Maxwell scored a game winning point to win the division championships for the schools bowling team.

References

External links 
 Mattituck-Cutchogue Union Free School District

Southold, New York
School districts in New York (state)
Education in Suffolk County, New York
1970s establishments in New York (state)